Haron Aminar Rashid bin Salim, popularly known as Harun Salim Bachik, (19 May 1959 – 8 March 2015) was a Malaysian actor and comedian.

Career 
Born in Singapore, Harun was the son of a veteran actor of the 50s era, Salim Bachik.

Harun became known through his acting in the drama series titled Rumah Kedai, which aired on TV3 from 1988 to 1993. In 2001, he stunned Malaysia's acting industry after winning Best Male TV Actor at the seventh Anugerah Skrin for his serious role in the drama Hangatnya Salju Dinginnya Bara.

Harun was also involved in the sitcom series Gado-Gado, which aired on TV1. It became a real stepping stone for him in the world of acting.

Apart from acting, Harun was also a singer. He once produced an album in 1996 entitled Belilah. The most popular song on the album is Banjir.

Through the film Baik Punya Cilok (2005), he was nominated as the Best Supporting Actor at the Malaysia Film Festival. Through the film KIL (2013), he was nominated for a similar award at the Screen Awards 2013.

Filmography

Film

Drama

Telefilm

Discography

Studio album 
 Belilah (1996)

References

External links 
 
 

1959 births
2015 deaths
Malaysian male actors
20th-century Malaysian male actors
21st-century Malaysian male actors
Malaysian comedians
Malaysian male singers
Malaysian people of Malay descent
Malay-language singers
Malaysian Muslims
People from Singapore